The Christian Unity Party was a Norwegian political party which ran for the 1993 parliamentary election. This was the only time the party put up lists for an election, and it was also only in the county of Vest-Agder. In 1994 the party merged with the New Future Coalition Party.

Political parties established in 1993
Political parties disestablished in 1994
Defunct political parties in Norway
Protestant political parties
1993 establishments in Norway
1994 disestablishments in Norway